William Bryk (born March 12, 1955) is an elected public official in the Town of Antrim, New Hampshire, a journalist, horseman, and perennial candidate.
Before Bryk left his former residence in Brooklyn, New York, he took advantage of the Constitutional requirement that candidates for U.S. Senator or U.S. Representative live in the state in which they are campaigning by the day of the general election.  This allowed Bryk to run in the primaries without ever visiting the state. Bryk generally ran in races that lacked a credible Democratic candidate. 

Bryk was also a New York City career civil servant, columnist for the New York Sun and contributing writer to New York Press.  He frequently contributes to Splice Today, edited and published by Russ Smith, former publisher of New York Press.

In March 2016, Bryk and his wife, Mimi Kramer-Bryk, a former theatre critic for The New Yorker, moved to Antrim, New Hampshire.  

He has been elected to the following offices in the Town of Antrim: Library Trustee, 2017; Cemetery Trustee, 2018, Planning Board Member, 2018, re-elected 2020; Cemetery Trustee, 2021; Supervisor of the Checklist, 2021, re-elected 2022; and Trustee of Trust Funds, 2021.

He was the Democratic nominee for Hillsborough County Register of Probate in 2016  and 2022 and the Democratic nominee for Hillsborough County Treasurer in 2018 and 2020.  In March 2018, he was elected a Cemetery Trustee and a member of the Planning Board in the Town of Antrim.  

He is a member of the New Hampshire and New York bars.  He is a former secretary and vice chairman of the Antrim Town Democratic Committee, a former delegate to the New Hampshire State Democratic Convention, and a Justice of the Peace.

Education
Bachelor of science in economics, Manhattan College, 1977; Juris Doctor, Fordham University School of Law, 1989.

Elections
  Bryk filed for Antrim Town Selectman in January 2023.
  In 2016, Bryk lost the election for Hillsborough County Register of Probate.
 In 2014, Bryk ran for the US Senate simultaneously in Alaska, Oregon, Wyoming and Idaho, where he received 30.4 percent of the vote, losing in all four races. He also ran for Congress in Indiana but was removed from the ballot.
 In 2012,  Bryk ran for the Senate in Wyoming and for Congress in Indiana, losing both races.
 In 2010, Bryk ran for the Senate in Idaho and lost.
 In 2004, Bryk sought the Federalist Party nomination for President of the United States.
 In 2000, Bryk won the Republican Vice-Presidential Primary in New Hampshire.
 In 1999, Bryk ran for District Attorney of Richmond County (Staten Island) and lost.
 In 1998, Bryk ran for the New York State Assembly and lost.
 In 1997, Bryk ran for New York City Council and lost.
 In 1996, Bryk ran for New York City Council and lost.
 In 1983, Bryk ran for Manhattan Community School District Board #6 and lost.
 In 1980, Bryk lost his first election running for Congress in New York.

References

1955 births
New York (state) lawyers
People from Brooklyn
Manhattan College alumni
Fordham University School of Law alumni
Journalists from New York City
New York (state) Democrats
Living people